Mighty Morphin Power Rangers is the title of five different video games based on the first season of the television series of the same name, one for each of the following game platforms: Sega Genesis/Mega Drive, Super Nintendo Entertainment System, Game Boy, Game Gear, and Sega CD. The Nintendo versions of the game were released by Bandai, while the Sega versions were published by Banpresto, a pseudonym of Bandai. The Green Ranger is only playable on the Genesis and Game Gear versions of the game.

Super NES

The Super NES version of Mighty Morphin Power Rangers is a side-scrolling action game composed of seven stages, with two different gameplay styles.

The four reviewers of Electronic Gaming Monthly gave the Super NES game a score of 6.5 out of 10 but a unanimously negative assessment, saying it has poor animation and dull level design and "is simply way too easy for experienced players." They praised the character selection feature, but concluded that even Power Ranger fans would find the game entertaining for only a short while.

Nintendo Magazine System gave the game an overall score of 77, describing the difficulty as "mighty tough". Praise was given to the energetic presentation and style akin to the TV show, fluid controls and animation, and the attention to detail in making each character unique with trademark moves. One of the reviewers gave Bandai credit for "a genuine attempt at something vaguely special", calling the result "pretty cool", while the other reviewer dubbed the game unoriginal. Other criticism was directed at the old-fashioned gameplay and repetitive feel, with the final consensus being that the game was more for hardcore fans than hardcore gamers.

Game Boy
The Game Boy version is a side-scrolling action game similar to the SNES game but much more simplified. There are five levels, each consisting of two segments. In the ranger segment, any of the five original rangers must go through a level while defeating putty patrols. Using the select button unlocks their unique weapon, but drains health with each use. The second segment is a Megazord fight versus the main villains of the show.

When played on the Super Game Boy, unique color palettes can be used with each ranger.

Genesis
The Sega Genesis/Mega Drive version is a one-on-one competitive fighting game, featuring two different game modes: a Scenario Mode where the player competes against a series of CPU-controlled opponents, and a Battle Mode for two players. In the Scenario Mode, the matches consist of two segments: the player will fight against a regular-sized monster as one of the Rangers, and after the defeating the monster they will battle a giant version of it. Initially, only the five original Rangers and the Megazord are available, but once the Green Ranger is defeated, he and the Dragonzord are unlocked.

GamePro panned the game, chiefly for the one-dimensional gameplay and unbalanced difficulty.

Game Gear
In this version, the player has three basic attacks (one of which is accomplished by pressing the two action buttons simultaneously), a throw, and three special moves per character. The Game Gear version has more levels and enemies than the Genesis version. The game consists of three game modes: a single-player story game which features a series of plot-based battles against an assortment of enemies, a single-player vs. game, and a two-player Link game in which two players battle each other using the link cable. Like the Genesis version, the Green Ranger and Dragonzord (Including Dragonzord Battle Mode) become unlocked once they are defeated in the story mode.

GamePro described the game as "a satisfying blend of fighting and adventure, perfect for beginning players." They commented that the game's story mode is simplistic and very easy, but enjoyable, and is enhanced by the ability to control any of the Power Rangers in the game's other modes. Electronic Gaming Monthly praised the large number of moves and the ability to play as the Megazord, and scored the game a 6.2 out of 10.

Sega CD

The Sega CD version is a full motion video-based quick time event game.

See also
Mighty Morphin Power Rangers: The Movie (video game)
Mighty Morphin Power Rangers: The Fighting Edition

References

External links
power rangers samurai fan game website
Game Boy, Game Gear, Genesis, and SNES versions at MobyGames

1994 video games
Bandai games
Beat 'em ups
Game Boy games
Game Boy-only games
Mighty Morphin Power Rangers
Natsume (company) games
Power Rangers video games
Sega CD games
Game Gear games
Sega Genesis games
Side-scrolling beat 'em ups
Superhero video games
Super Nintendo Entertainment System games
Fighting games
Video games developed in Japan
Video games scored by Iku Mizutani
Video games scored by Kinuyo Yamashita
Video games featuring female protagonists
Video games set in 1994
Video games set in California